The Seven Years' War, 1754–1763, spanned four continents, affecting Europe, the Americas, West Africa, and India and the Philippines, in Asia.

The conflict split Europe into two coalitions: Kingdom of Great Britain, Prussia, Portugal, Hanover, and other small German states on one side versus the Kingdom of France, Austria-led Holy Roman Empire, Russia, Spain, several small German states, and Sweden on the other. The coalitions represented a "revolution" in diplomatic alliances, reflected in the Diplomatic Revolution.  Ultimately, the victory of the Anglo-Prussian coalition undercut the balance of power in Europe, a balance that was not reestablished until 1815.

Situation
Although Anglo-French skirmishes over their American colonies had already begun in 1754, the seven year long large-scale war that drew in most of the European powers was centered on Austria's desire to recover Silesia, which it had lost in 1747 to Prussia under Frederick the Great's takeover. In India, the Mughal Empire, with the encouragement of the French, tried to crush a British attempt to conquer Bengal: these are known as the Third Carnatic War.

In the European theater, seeing the opportunity to curtail Britain's and Prussia's ever-growing power, France and Austria put aside their ancient rivalry to form a coalition of their own. Britain faced with this sudden turn of events aligned herself with Prussia This alliance drew in not only the British king's territories in personal union by marriage, including Hanover, but also those of his relatives in the Electorate of Brunswick-Lüneburg and the Landgraviate of Hesse-Kassel. This series of political maneuvers became known as the Diplomatic Revolution.

In the Americas, the same coalitions prevailed but each side added a First Nation "Indian" partner.  Abenaki, an Algonquin speaking tribe, joined with the French. The Iroquois, or Five Nations, joined with the British.  To both sides, the war in North America particularly proved expensive.  The Iroquois, who lived predominantly in lands controlled by the French, wrought havoc on the European trade routes and settlements of France.  The Abenaki, who were also known as "People of the Dawn", lived in, or had been displaced by, English settlers in the Atlantic colonies, thus they antagonized British trade and activities.  In the West Indies, the British and Spanish fought for control of key points in the Caribbean trade routes, particularly the Windward Passage and Havana. In West Africa, the British effort was to oust France from its colonies in Gorée, Senegal, and Gambia.

After seven years of exhaustive and expensive fighting (nine in North America), the Anglo-Prussian coalition prevailed. The war marked the rise of Britain as the world's predominant power; it also destroyed France's land supremacy in Europe, and Prussia, due to Frederick the Great's military prowess, established itself as a dominant land-power in Europe. The Austrian Habsburgs lost permanently their territories in Silesia to Prussia.  This altered the European balance of power.

Battles

Notes

 
Seven Years' War
 
Prussia